Donald McRae (13 June 1873 – 22 October 1940) was an Australian cricketer. He played in three first-class matches for South Australia in 1906/07.

See also
 List of South Australian representative cricketers

References

External links
 

1873 births
1940 deaths
Australian cricketers
South Australia cricketers
Cricketers from Adelaide